An election for Limerick City Council was held in 1920 as part of the wider 1920 Irish local elections.

The election saw Sinn Féin winning control of the council, with 26 of the councils 40 seats.

Aggregate results

The result had the following consequences for the total number of seats on the council after the elections:

References

1920 Irish local elections
1920